BBC East Midlands is the BBC English Region covering Derbyshire (except High Peak, North East Derbyshire and the northern areas of the Derbyshire Dales), Leicestershire, Nottinghamshire (except Bassetlaw), Rutland, southern parts of South Kesteven in Lincolnshire and some northern parts of Northamptonshire.

Services

Television
BBC East Midlands'''s television output consists only of the flagship regional news service East Midlands Today.

The television area is bigger than the region's radio area, because of the coverage from Waltham over Lincolnshire and Northamptonshire. In reality, Radio Leicester covers much the same area as TV reception from Waltham, including all of Northamptonshire.

Radio
The region is the controlling centre for BBC Radio Nottingham, BBC Radio Derby and BBC Radio Leicester.

On weekdays, each local radio station will have three standardised programme blocks with a total of three presenters for daytime as follows:

 6am Breakfast
 10am Mid-morning
 2pm Afternoons
 6pm Evenings

Online and InteractiveBBC East Midlands also produces regional news & local radio pages for BBC Red Button and the 'BBC Local News' websites for each county.

History
The region itself used to be part of BBC Midlands as one large region controlled from Pebble Mill Studios but was served by a small television and radio studio based on the top floor of Willson House on Derby Road in Nottingham. This studio supplied live reporter pieces and interviews as injects into the BBC Midlands evening programme "Midlands Today", which were seen by the whole region - the Nottingham studio also produced some regional programming, including The Dog Show and Dennis McCarthy's Weekly Echo.

However, to better serve East Midlands viewers, a few changes were made. Initially, the region was given an opt-out news service consisting of an opt-out within Midlands Today and some short bulletins, but this was expanded in January 1991, when a whole new region was created. The new region had a new news programme, although the programme's visual identity remained the same as its West Midlands counterpart. The region is now very much separate from the Midlands region.

Transmission service area
Although the East Midlands and West Midlands are similar in size, the Birmingham programme covers a larger area than the Nottingham programme because its region has three main transmitters, and the Nottingham programme has one, of which the eastern half of Waltham's TSA is outside the BBC East Midlands area. Waltham is on the eastern edge of Leicestershire, and is also the main transmitter for south Lincolnshire. North Northamptonshire is near to Waltham as well.

The journalistic coverage is different from the broadcast coverage because of the set of radio stations that are tied to the BBC East Midlands region, and which are not. Peterborough and north Northamptonshire, although mostly covered by Waltham, have their radio stations both tied to the BBC East region in distant Norwich.

It began broadcasting in widescreen format in July 2002.

Studios

In 1991 the TV studios, Radio Nottingham, and the BBC region's offices were at York House on Mansfield Road. This became Nottingham Trent University's Centre for Broadcasting & Journalism, with the TV studios left intact; NTU's centre opened in September 1999. York House was demolished in 2021. In 2009, NTU moved its broadcasting centre to its Chaucer Building on Goldsmith Street.

New headquarters
The Nottingham headquarters were built after the region was created, and were state of the art. Construction began on Wednesday 3 September 1997, costing £4.5m, and built by Simons Construction of Lincoln; the site had been bought originally from Boots. The site opened on Sunday 10 January 1999.Nottingham Evening Post Saturday 9 January 1999, page 6 At the time Richard Lucas was HRLP for the region, and this region included Lincolnshire.Nottingham Evening Post Tuesday 9 September 1997, page 58

When constructed in January 1999, it contained the newsroom for East Midlands Today, a small studio for use by regional news, and accommodation for BBC Radio Nottingham. It is located on London Road'', Nottingham.

In addition to the main headquarters, the region has offices in St. Helens Street, Derby containing BBC Radio Derby, and in St. Nicholas Place, Leicester housing BBC Radio Leicester. Both of these premises also contain news bureaux for East Midlands Today.

See also

 BBC English Regions
 The East Midlands Television Centre, of Central East, opened in November 1983, cost £23m, and officially opened by Prince Philip, Duke of Edinburgh at 11.30am on 2 March 1984, after he arrived on the Royal train at 10am, and later personally flying a Hawker Siddeley Andover from East Midlands Airport to Heathrow.

References

External links
 BBC Local News
 East Midlands Today
 BBC East Midlands transmitter coverage map 

East Midlands
Culture in Nottingham
Mass media in the East Midlands
Organisations based in Nottingham
Organizations established in 1991
1991 establishments in England